The Kawasaki Z300 (codenamed ER300) is a standard motorcycle manufactured by Kawasaki. It was introduced in 2014 at the Milan Motorcycle Show as part of its Z series for the 2015 model year. It is sold in Asia, Australia, Europe and South America, and designed and marketed as the streetfighter version of the Ninja 300.

Components

Engine 
The Z300 is powered by a  liquid-cooled 4-stroke 8-valve DOHC parallel-twin engine. Reliable third party dynamometer testing results have not been published.

Clutch 
Like the Ninja 300, the Z300 has a wet multi-disc clutch with slipper and assist functions to relieve pressure generated by rapid downshifting, and lighten the clutch pull.

Wheels 
The Z300 comes stock with 17" diameter and 4" wide multi-spoke rims, fitted with IRC Road Winner bias ply tires. The stock tires are sized 110/70-17 54S front, and 140/70-17 66S rear.

Performance 

References

External links 
 Official website (Australia)

Z300
Standard motorcycles
Motorcycles powered by straight-twin engines